Adriana Fabiola Corona García (born April 7, 1980), known as Adriana Corona, is a Mexican triathlete, who won two gold medals at the 2006 Central American and Caribbean Games in Cartagena, Colombia.

Corona started out her sporting career as an adventurer and cross-country racer in 2000, until she began with triathlon at the ITU Triathlon Pan American Cup in Puerto Vallarta two years later. In 2005, she finally reached into the international scene, and made a comeback in triathlon after pursuing her full-time sporting career in mountain biking. In the same year, she had also achieved her first medal, by claiming the silver at the ITU Triathlon Pan American Cup in Ixtapa. Corona competed at the 2006 Central American and Caribbean Games, where she won gold medals in the women's individual and team events, along with her compatriot Melody Ramirez. Corona's best result in these games contributed to her qualifying place for the 2007 Pan American Games in Rio de Janeiro, where she placed seventh in the women's event, and consequently, for the 2008 Summer Olympics in Beijing. At the Olympics, Corona maintained her pace in a field of fifty-five competitors during the swimming leg, but she got lapped by the leader in the road cycling course.

Notes

References

External links
 
 

1980 births
Living people
Triathletes at the 2008 Summer Olympics
Olympic triathletes of Mexico
Sportspeople from Guadalajara, Jalisco
Mexican female triathletes
Central American and Caribbean Games gold medalists for Mexico
Competitors at the 2006 Central American and Caribbean Games
Central American and Caribbean Games medalists in triathlon
Triathletes at the 2007 Pan American Games
Pan American Games competitors for Mexico
21st-century Mexican women
20th-century Mexican women